The Journal of Science and Medicine in Sport (JSAMS) is a monthly peer-reviewed medical journal covering sports science and sports medicine. It is published by Elsevier on behalf of Sports Medicine Australia and the editor-in-chief is Tim Meyer (Saarland University). It was established in 1984 as the Australian Journal of Science and Medicine in Sport, which was a merger of two earlier journals, the Australian Journal of Sports Medicine and Exercise Sciences and the Australian Journal of Sport Sciences.

Affiliated societies 
JSAMS is the official society journal of Sports Medicine Australia, which joins medical professionals working in the sports medicine field and Allied Health professionals working in sports medicine or sports science. Other affiliated societies are: the Australasian Academy of Podiatric Sports Medicine, Exercise and Sports Science Australia, Australian Physiotherapy Association-Sports Physiotherapy Australia, College of Sport Psychologists, Sports Dietitians Australia, Sports Doctors Australia, and Australasian College of Sport and Exercise Physicians.

Abstracting and indexing
The journal is abstracted and indexed in:

According to the Journal Citation Reports, the journal has a 2020 impact factor of 4.319.

References

External links
 

Sports medicine journals
Publications established in 1984
English-language journals
Elsevier academic journals
Monthly journals